Cyphononyx is a genus of spider hunting wasps in the family Pompilidae.

Selected species
The following species are listed as belonging to this genus:

Cyphononyx abyssinicus Gribodo, 1879
Cyphononyx aeneipennis H. Lucas, 1898
Cyphononyx anguliferus (H. Lucas, 1897)
Cyphononyx antarcticus (Linnaeus, 1767)
Cyphononyx antennatus (Smith, 1855)
Cyphononyx apicalis (Saussure, 1891)
Cyphononyx auropubens Arnold, 1932
Cyphononyx bipartitus (Lepeletier, 1845)
Cyphononyx bretonii (Guérin, 1844)
Cyphononyx camerunensis Tullgren, 1904
Cyphononyx castaneus (Klug, 1834)
Cyphononyx claggi Banks, 1934
Cyphononyx confusus Dahlbom, 1845
Cyphononyx decipiens (Smith, 1855)
Cyphononyx decoratus Saussure, 1891
Cyphononyx fatalis (Gerstaecker, 1857)
Cyphononyx fulvognathus (Rohwer, 1911)
Cyphononyx gowdeyi (Turner, 1918)
Cyphononyx grandidieri Saussure, 1887
Cyphononyx madecassus Saussure, 1887
Cyphononyx muelleri Saussure, 1890
Cyphononyx nyasicus Arnold, 1932
Cyphononyx obscurus (Smith, 1855)
Cyphononyx optimus (Smith, 1855)
Cyphononyx pan Arnold, 1932
Cyphononyx parvulus Banks, 1941
Cyphononyx plebejus (Saussure, 1868)
Cyphononyx promontorii Arnold, 1932
Cyphononyx purpureipennis Arnold, 1948
Cyphononyx rathjensi Wahis, 2000 
Cyphononyx subauratus Turner, 1918
Cyphononyx umtaliensis Arnold, 1932
Cyphononyx usambarensis H. Lucas, 1898
Cyphononyx ustus Haupt, 1933

References

Hymenoptera genera
Pepsinae
Taxa named by Anders Gustaf Dahlbom